Bamse and the City of Thieves is a 2014 animated feature film featuring Bamse.

Voice cast 
 Tomas Bolme - Narrator
 Peter Haber - Bamse
 Morgan Alling - Lille Skutt
 Steve Kratz - Skalman
 Magnus Härenstam - Reinard Räv
 Maria Langhammer - Farmor
 Shebly Niavarani - Vargen
 Tea Stjärne - Nalle-Maja
 Leif Andrée - Knocke and Smocke
 Maria Bolme - Brummelisa
 Tomas Tivemark - Buster Pirat
 Edith Enberg-Salibli - Katta-Lo
 Karin Gidfors - Fröken Fiffi
 Susanne Kujala - Farliga Flisan Sork
 Nicklas Lindh - Ola Grävling, Konstapel Kask, Troll
 Rolf Lydahl - Kubbe Vargkusin
 Kim Sulocki - Lilla vargkusinen
 Martin Mighetto - Busifer/conductor/troll
 Jens Johansson - Slaske Sork/stollen
 Jonas Jansson - Husmusen/Katten Jansson

UK English Voice cast 
 David Jason - Narrator
 John Hasler - Bamse
 Emma Thompson - Lille Skutt
 Gildart Jackson - Skalman
 John Cleese - Reinard Räv

References

External links

Official site

2014 animated films
2014 films
Swedish children's films
Swedish animated films
Films based on Swedish comics
Animated films based on comics
Tre Vänner films
2010s Swedish films